John Rupp may refer to:

 John Rupp, a guard who played for the Buffalo All-Americans during the inaugural season of the National Football League; see 
 John Rupp, director off The Way International

See also
 John Rapp